The 2007 Kangaroo Island bushfires were a series of bushfires caused by lightning strikes on 6 December 2007 on Kangaroo Island, South Australia, resulting in the destruction of  of national park and wilderness protection area. The fires occurred mainly across the western side of the island near Flinders Chase National Park, Vivonne Bay, D'Estrees Bay, Western River and Riverleas.

Overview 
The D'Estrees Bay fire in Cape Gantheaume Conservation Park was contained by 12 December 2007, while intense fires in the west, which included the protected areas of Flinders Chase National Park and Ravine des Casoars Wilderness Protection Area, were more difficult to extinguish.

On 14 December 2007, the Country Fire Service officially announced that all fires were contained. The event was South Australia's largest bush fire operation to date with over 800 personnel, 7 fixed wing water bombers and an Elvis Skycrane Helitanker all assisting in firefighting efforts, together with units from Victoria's Country Fire Authority and the New South Wales Rural Fire Service.

A state of emergency was considered but was rejected on 10 December 2007 due to cooler conditions. A state of emergency would have seen the Australian Army move in to assist the Country Fire Service and Department of Environment personnel.

The total damage bill is estimated at A$2.3 million.

References

2007 in Australia
December 2007 events in Australia
Bushfires in South Australia
2007 wildfires
Kangaroo Island
2000s in South Australia